Tuva Moa Matilda Karolina Novotny Hedström (born 21 December 1979) is a Swedish actress, director, and singer.

She was born in Stockholm, and was raised in Åmot, Brunskog, outside Arvika. She is the daughter of Czech film director David Jan Novotný and Swedish artist Barbro Hedström. At a young age, she participated in Vår teater, a children's theater in Stockholm.

Filmography

1996–1999: Skilda världar (TV soap opera)
1997: Tic Tac
2000: Sleepwalker
2000: Naken
2000: Jalla! Jalla!
2000: Herr von Hancken (TV miniseries)
2001: Anja
2002: Den Osynlige
2003:  (TV)
2003: Slim Susie
2003: Make Believe
2003: Midsummer (original Danish title: ,)
2004: Stratosphere Girl
2004: Day and Night
2004: Waiting for Rain
2004: Familien Gregersen (English title: Lost Generation)
2005: Young Andersen
2005: Close to Heaven (original title: Blizko Nebe)
2005: Four Weeks in June
2005: Stoned
2005: Bang Bang Orangutang
2006: No. 2 a.k.a. Naming Number Two
2006: All it takes is a miracle
2006: Snapphanar
2007: The Black Madonna
2008: The Candidate
2009: Original
2009: Possession
2009: Simon & Malou
2009: Bröllopsfotografen
2010: Truth About Men
2010: Dear Alice
2010: Eat Pray Love
2010: Dag (Norwegian comedy drama series)
2011: ID:A
2012: Fuck Up
2012: 
2013: Crimes of Passion (collective title for a series of six feature-length TV crime dramas)
2015: A War
2016: The King's Choice
2016: Nobel (TV series)
2017: Borg/McEnroe
2018: Annihilation
2018: Blind Spot (writer/director)
2019: Britt-Marie Was Here (writer/director)
2019: Exit Plan
2021: The Middle Man2021: Bonus Family (TV series)
2022: The Kingdom (TV series)
2022: Zero Contact''

Music
2003 – "Newfound Lover", from the album

References

External links

1979 births
Actresses from Stockholm
Living people
Sommar (radio program) hosts
Swedish film actresses
Swedish soap opera actresses
Swedish people of Czech descent
21st-century Swedish singers
21st-century Swedish women singers
21st-century Swedish actresses
People from Åmot